Kirby Hill, also called Kirby-on-the-Moor, is a village and civil parish about  north of the market town of Boroughbridge, in the Harrogate district of North Yorkshire, England.

Geography
The village is on a section of the Great North Road that is now the B6265. It was part of the A1 until the section of the A1(M) west of the village was built. The A1(M) motorway passes through the parish just west of the village.

The 2001 Census recorded the population as 355, of whom 294 were more than 16 years old and 168 of these were in employment. There were 155 dwellings of which 105 were detached. The 2011 Census recorded the population as 391.

Manor
The Domesday Book of 1086 records Kirby as Chirchbi in the hundred of Hallikeld. Gospatric, son of Arnketil held the manor of Kirby at the time of the Norman conquest of England. Afterwards the manor was seized by the Crown, but Gospatric remained lord of the manor on behalf of the King.

At some date the manor passed to the Mowbray family, who later sold part of it to Newburgh Priory. After the priory was dissolved in the 16th century the Crown granted the manor to Nevill family of Thornton Bridge. In 1672 the Nevill family sold the manor to Sir Robert Long. In the 19th century the Rawson family of Nidd Hall bought the manor.

Church and chapel

Parish church

The oldest parts of the Church of England parish church of All Saints, Kirby-on-the-Moor are Anglo-Saxon and were built in the 10th century. In and around the church are 12 stones with Celtic carvings. At the base of the southwest corner of the church is a large granite block with a Roman inscription. It is too weathered to be legible, but it appears to be a dedication to either Antoninus Pius or Caracalla, which would make it second- or early third-century.

The north aisle of the church was added late in the 12th century, with a Norman two-bay arcade inserted into the Saxon north wall of the nave. The chancel is late 12th- or early 13th-century. Later in the 13th century the north chapel was added. It has a squint to the chancel so that a priest celebrating Mass could follow the priest who was doing the same at the high altar. In the 15th century the chancel was enlarged and its present east window with Perpendicular Gothic tracery was inserted.

In 1870 the church was restored under the direction of George Gilbert Scott. The present south porch was built to his Gothic Revival design, incorporating various worked stones ranging from the Saxon era to the 13th century. The church is a Grade I listed building.

The west tower has a ring of six bells. Richard Seliok of Nottingham cast the tenor bell in about 1520. Samuel II Smith of York cast the fourth bell in 1713 and the fifth bell in 1718. John Warner & Sons of Cripplegate, London cast the treble, second and third bells in 1869.

Chapel
There used to be a Wesleyan chapel in the village.

Economic and social history
In a rebellion of barons against Edward II in 1322, Sir Andreas de Harcla mustered his army near Kirby Hill before the Battle of Boroughbridge.

The Pilmoor, Boroughbridge and Knaresborough Railway ran through the parish. In 1964 British Railways closed the line.

A campaign group, Kirby Hill RAMS (Residents Against Motorway Services) opposed the development. Led by its Chairman, Gareth Owens, RAMS succeeded in opposing the plans at when they came before Harrogate Borough Council's Planning Committee and at three major public inquiries when the developer appealed. On 16 October 2012 the then Secretary of State for Communities and Local Government, Eric Pickles, formally rejected the plan after the third public inquiry. On 19 November 2019, Harrogate Borough Council's Planning Committee rejected a new MSA scheme at the same site proposed by Applegreen. However, the application was approved in April 2021.

Kirby Hill has a pub, the Blue Bell Inn. It is on Leeming Lane, the main road through the village.

Schools

Kirby Hill Church of England Primary School has a modern school building, opened in June 2002. The old school near the Vicarage was built in 1867.

For secondary education the parish is in the catchment area of Boroughbridge High School and Ripon Grammar School.

Governance
Kirby Hill and District Parish Council has eight members. The parish is in the Bishop Monkton & Newby ward of the Borough of Harrogate (district council); the Boroughbridge electoral division of North Yorkshire County Council and the Skipton and Ripon constituency of the UK Parliament.

References

Bibliography

External links

 Kirby Hill near Boroughbridge
 All Saints' Church Kirby-on-the-Moor, also known as Kirby Hill
 Kirby Hill Primary School

Civil parishes in North Yorkshire
Villages in North Yorkshire